Borja Gómez Pérez (born 14 May 1988) is a Spanish former professional footballer who played as a central defender.

Club career
Gómez was born in Madrid. An unsuccessful graduate from Real Madrid's youth system, he made his professional debut with another team in the community, AD Alcorcón, going on to spend three full seasons in the Segunda División B.

In the 2010–11 campaign, Gómez had his first Segunda División experience, with another club from the Spanish capital, Rayo Vallecano. On 2 March 2011, after having played all the minutes in his 11 league appearances – mainly due to Iván Amaya's injury, however, as he was never part of manager José Ramón Sandoval's plans (a claim which the latter denied)– he signed a three-year contract with Ukrainian Premier League side FC Karpaty Lviv.

Gómez returned to his homeland the ensuing winter transfer window, joining Granada CF initially on loan. His first game in La Liga took place on 21 January 2012, when he featured the full 90 minutes in a 3–0 away loss against RCD Espanyol; during his two-year spell at the Nuevo Estadio de Los Cármenes, he made 31 competitive appearances.

In the following years, Gómez alternated between the second and third tier of Spanish football, representing Hércules CF, CD Lugo, Real Oviedo, Real Murcia and UD Logroñés. While at the service of the third club, he suffered a right knee injury in January 2016 that sidelined him for seven months.

On 23 August 2018, Gómez signed with East Bengal Club of the Indian I-League. In January 2020, after spending several months on the sidelines due to injury, he returned home due to personal reasons, and eventually asked to be released.

Career statistics

References

External links

1988 births
Living people
Spanish footballers
Footballers from Madrid
Association football defenders
La Liga players
Segunda División players
Segunda División B players
AD Alcorcón footballers
Rayo Vallecano players
Granada CF footballers
Hércules CF players
CD Lugo players
Real Oviedo players
Real Murcia players
UD Logroñés players
UD San Sebastián de los Reyes players
Ukrainian Premier League players
FC Karpaty Lviv players
I-League players
East Bengal Club players
Spanish expatriate footballers
Expatriate footballers in Ukraine
Expatriate footballers in India
Spanish expatriate sportspeople in Ukraine
Spanish expatriate sportspeople in India